George Knox Merrill (16 October 1864 –21 October 1927) was an American lichenologist. He was a leading exponent of lichenology in the early 20th century. He was particularly interested in species of the family Cladoniaceae, in which he published several new species, varieties, and forms. In 1909 he started publishing Lichenes Exsiccati, which he continued intermittently until 1927; 400 specimens were presented in this exsiccata series.

Merrill was born in Lewiston, Maine, to John Merrill (a farmer) and Jane Prescott. He attended public schools in Lewiston, and later, in Boston where he and his mother moved after his father died. He entered Harvard University but never finished a degree there. Around this time he took up an interest in journalism and started writing articles for the newspaper The Beverly Citizen. Merrill was also a chess player of note, and once won the state championship of Maine.

References

External links
  Farlow Reference Library of Cryptogamic Botany – George Knox Merrill (1864–1927) Papers

American lichenologists
1864 births
1927 deaths
People from Lewiston, Maine